This article provides a discography of the official releases by Australian singer Daniel Merriweather.

Studio albums

Extended plays

Singles

*Did not appear in the official Belgian Ultratop 50 charts, but rather in the bubbling under Ultratip charts.

As a featured artist

*Did not appear in the official Belgian Ultratop 50 charts, but rather in the bubbling under Ultratip charts under the section "Extra hits" without any position being specified for the song.

Promotional singles

Guest/soundtrack appearances
A Little Bit Better Arthur (film) (Original Motion Picture Soundtrack) (2011)
All I Want (w/Disco Montego), Disco Montego (album) (2002)
Another Way Down (w/Harmonic), One Last Ride (soundtrack album) (2005)
Breakadawn (w/Rhymefest), Man In The Mirror (mixtape) (2007)
Bloodlust (w/Pnau) Again (album) (2003)
Can't Buy You Arthur (film) (Original Motion Picture Soundtrack) (2011)
Catch Phrase (w/Phrase) Talk With Force (album) (2005)
Caught Up (w/ Brad Strut) Legend: Official (album) (2007)
Chains (w/Phrase) Clockwork (album) (2009)
Come Fly With Me (w/Mystro) Diggi Down Unda (album) (2006)
Dazed Arthur (film) (Original Motion Picture Soundtrack) (2011)
Does She Like It (w/Phrase) Talk With Force (album)(2005)
Four Seasons (w/Jase) Jase Connection Vol. 1 (album) (2006)
Heart & Soul (w/Phrase) Talk With Force (album) (2006)
Let's Ride (w/Wale) 100 Miles & Running (mixtape) (2007)
Maybe (feat. Lee Sissing); Hating Alison Ashley (Various Artists soundtrack album) (2005)
Money In My Pocket (w/ Wiley) See Clear Now (album) (2008)
Pot Of Gold (w/ Wale), 10 Deep Presents The New Deal (v/a mixtape) (2008)
Stop Me (AKA "Stop Me Medley") (w/Mark Ronson) Version (2007)
The End (songwriting credits) (SugaRush Beat Company feat. Michael Franti of Spearhead) SugaRush Beat Company (2008)
Tied Up (w/ Juse), Global Casino (album) (2006)
Tied Up Pt. 2 (w/ Ethical), Ages Turn (album) (2008)
Who Is She? (w/DJ Peril) King Of The Beats (album) (2006)
War (w/Wale) More About Nothing (mixtape) (2010)
In 2005, Merriweather recorded vocals for a song by Freeway, but this track remains unreleased.

Videography

Music videos

Music video appearances

References

External links

Discographies of Australian artists
Rhythm and blues discographies